Lipiny  is a settlement in the administrative district of Gmina Secemin, within Włoszczowa County, Świętokrzyskie Voivodeship, in south-central Poland.

References

Villages in Włoszczowa County